Peter Stephens may refer to:
Peter Stephens (actor) (1920–1972), English actor
Peter Stephens (footballer, born 1879) (1879–1946), Australian rules footballer who played with Geelong in the 1900s
Peter Stephens (footballer, born 1950), former Australian rules footballer who played with Geelong in the 1970s
Peter Stephens (journalist) (1927–2016), British journalist and newspaper editor
Peter Stephens (pioneer) (1687–1757), founder of Stephens City, Virginia
Peter John Stephens (1912–2002), British children's author

See also
Peter Stevens (disambiguation)